This article is about the particular significance of the year 1877 to Wales and its people.

Incumbents

Lord Lieutenant of Anglesey – William Owen Stanley 
Lord Lieutenant of Brecknockshire – Joseph Bailey, 1st Baron Glanusk
Lord Lieutenant of Caernarvonshire – Edward Douglas-Pennant, 1st Baron Penrhyn 
Lord Lieutenant of Cardiganshire – Edward Pryse
Lord Lieutenant of Carmarthenshire – John Campbell, 2nd Earl Cawdor 
Lord Lieutenant of Denbighshire – William Cornwallis-West  
Lord Lieutenant of Flintshire – Hugh Robert Hughes
Lord Lieutenant of Glamorgan – Christopher Rice Mansel Talbot 
Lord Lieutenant of Merionethshire – Edward Lloyd-Mostyn, 2nd Baron Mostyn
Lord Lieutenant of Monmouthshire – Henry Somerset, 8th Duke of Beaufort
Lord Lieutenant of Montgomeryshire – Sudeley Hanbury-Tracy, 3rd Baron Sudeley
Lord Lieutenant of Pembrokeshire – William Edwardes, 4th Baron Kensington
Lord Lieutenant of Radnorshire – Arthur Walsh, 2nd Baron Ormathwaite 

Bishop of Bangor – James Colquhoun Campbell
Bishop of Llandaff – Alfred Ollivant 
Bishop of St Asaph – Joshua Hughes 
Bishop of St Davids – Basil Jones

Archdruid of the National Eisteddfod of Wales – Clwydfardd

Events
8 March – In a mining accident at Worcester Colliery, Swansea, seventeen men are killed.
11 April – In a mining accident at Tynewydd Colliery, Rhondda, five men are killed by flooding. Twenty-five of the rescue team are awarded the Albert Medal for bravery.
10 July – Consecration of new Merthyr Synagogue, the oldest surviving synagogue building in Wales.
1 August – Opening of new Llandudno Pier.
15 August – Opening to passengers of the North Wales Narrow Gauge Railways from Dinas to Tryfan Junction and Bryngwyn.
30 November – Opening of the new market hall at Builth Wells by Sir Joseph Bailey M.P.
unknown dates
Opening of Stepaside, Pembrokeshire village school (part of modern-day Stepaside Heritage Park).
Closure of lead mine at Loggerheads, Denbighshire.

Arts and literature
Islwyn wins a bardic chair at Treherbert.

New books
Richard Davies (Mynyddog) – Y Trydydd Cynnig
William Rees (Gwilym Hiraethog) – Helyntion Bywyd Hen Deiliwr

Music
Joseph Parry resigns from his position as Professor of Music at University of Wales, Aberystwyth.

Sport
Football
The Racecourse Ground at Wrexham hosts Wales' first ever home international match, making it the world's oldest international football stadium still to host international matches.
The Welsh Cup is inaugurated.
Rugby union
8 November – Blaenavon RFC play their first game, against Abergavenny.

Births
2 May – Sid Bevan, Welsh international rugby union player (died 1933)
6 June (in Guernsey) – Herbert John Fleure, zoologist and geographer (died 1969)
9 June – George Travers, Wales international rugby union player (died 1945)
21 June – Elizabeth Mary Jones (Moelona), Welsh-language children's novelist (died 1953)
1 July – Llewellyn Lloyd, Wales international rugby union player (died 1957)
19 August – John Evans, supercentenarian (died 1990)
17 September – Henry Seymour Berry, 1st Baron Buckland, industrialist (died 1928)
26 September (in Wandsworth) – Edmund Gwenn, actor (died 1959) (long believed to have been born in Wales)
5 October – Lily Gower, croquet player (died 1959)
27 October – David Harris Davies, Wales international rugby union player (died 1944)
7 November – Maurice Parry, footballer (died 1935)
27 November – Leigh Richmond Roose, football goalkeeper (killed in battle 1916)
2 December – John Strand-Jones, Wales international rugby union player (died 1958)

Deaths
9 January – Thomas Thomas, clergyman, 72
24 June – Robert Dale Owen, Welsh-American politician, 75
14 July – Richard Davies (Mynyddog), poet, 44
18 July – Thomas Richards, "father of Tasmanian journalism", 77
27 July – John Frost, Chartist leader, 93
5 August – Robert Williams (Trebor Mai), poet, 47
17 October – Charles Williams, academic, 73?
7 November – Calvert Jones, painter and pioneer photographer, 72
13 December – John Griffith (journalist), journalist who wrote under the pseudonym Y Gohebydd, 56

References

 
Wales